Ram Chandra Purve Yadav  is a member of the Bihar Legislative Council. In the elections on March 23, 11 candidates were elected unopposed. Shri Purve is former state president of Rashtriya Janata Dal Bihar.

References

Rashtriya Janata Dal politicians
Living people
Year of birth missing (living people)
Members of the Bihar Legislative Council